Savarkundla railway station  is a major railway station serving in Amreli district of Gujarat State of India. It is under Bhavnagar railway division of Western Railway zone of Indian Railways. Passenger and Superfast trains halt here.

Major trains

Following major trains halt at Savarkundla railway station in both direction:

 12945/46 Surat–Mahuva Superfast Express
 22993/94 Bandra Terminus–Mahuva Superfast Express
 22989/90 Bandra Terminus–Mahuva Express

References

Railway stations in Amreli district
Bhavnagar railway division